The 2016 Men's Australian Hockey League was the 26th edition of the Australian Hockey League men's Field Hockey tournament. The tournament was held in the Western Australia city of Perth.

For the first time, the Australian Hockey League hosted international teams from India, Malaysia and New Zealand. 

The VIC Vikings won the gold medal for the third time by defeating the WA Thundersticks 5–3 in the final. The NSW Waratahs won the bronze medal after defeating the India Under–21 side 5–1 in the third place match.

Teams
Domestic Teams

  Canberra Lakers
  NSW Waratahs
  NT Stingers
  QLD Blades
  SA Hotshots
  Tassie Tigers
  VIC Vikings
  WA Thundersticks

International Teams

Results

First round

Pool A

Pool B

Classification

Ninth to twelfth place classification

Crossover

Eleventh and twelfth place

Ninth and tenth place

Fifth to eighth place classification

Crossover

Seventh and eighth place

Fifth and sixth place

Medal round

Semi-finals

Third and fourth place

Final

Awards

Statistics

Final standings

Goalscorers

References

External links

2016
2016 in Australian field hockey
2016 in Indian sport
2016 in New Zealand sport
2016 in Malaysian sport